Megadelphax is a genus of true bugs belonging to the family Delphacidae.

The species of this genus are found in Europe.

Species:
 Megadelphax amoena Logvinenko, 1977 
 Megadelphax bidentatus (Anufriev, 1970)

References

Delphacidae